Strauwen is a Belgian surname that may refer to
Louis Strauwen, Belgian rower
Pierre Strauwen, Belgian Olympic swimmer 
René Strauwen (1901–1960), Belgian field hockey player